Trips on an Old Car is a 1985 Soviet comedy film directed by Pyotr Fomenko.

Plot 
The film tells about a grandmother who is deprived of the opportunity to meet her only grandson, gets acquainted with the new father-in-law of a former daughter-in-law and falls in love with him.

Cast 
 Lyudmila Maksakova as Zoya Pavlovna
 Andrei Boltnev as German Sergeyevich
 Tatyana Nikitina as Natalya Stepanovna
 Sergey Nikitin as Lomov
 Yelena Karadzhova as Dasha
 Lyudmila Arinina as Club director
 Larisa Udovichenko as Lilya
 Lev Perfilov as Mikhalyov
 Grigori Gurvich
 Elena Drobysheva

References

External links 
 

1985 films
1980s Russian-language films
Soviet comedy films
1985 comedy films